Stanislaus N.I.M. "Stan" Storimans (8 January 1969 – 12 August 2008) was a Dutch RTL television veteran cameraman. He had planned to publish a book describing his 20 years of reporting from hotspots like Afghanistan, Republic of the Congo, Indonesia, Iraq, Sri Lanka, the former Zaire (now Democratic Republic of the Congo) and the former Yugoslavia, among others. He was killed in a Russian airstrike on the Georgian city of Gori during the 2008 Russo-Georgian War.

Death
Storimans was killed during Russian bombing of the Georgian city of Gori during the war in Georgia. Seven others were injured in the attack, including a Dutch correspondent for RTL,  Jeroen Akkermans, while the Israeli journalist Zadok Yehezkeli was seriously wounded and evacuated to Israel for treatment after surgery in Tbilisi. At least two other people were also reported killed. The bomb hit an area near the media centre that had been set up on the roof of the city's television and radio centre. Human Rights Watch has reported it found the evidence that cluster bomb has been used by the Russians in the attack which killed Storimans. The initial Reuters report that their analysis of the footage from the scene shows that the explosions may have come from mortar fire.

Sandra E. Roelofs, the Dutch-born wife of Georgian President Mikheil Saakashvili, offered to attend the funeral, but his family declined the offer as they didn't want to politicise the ceremony. Storimans was buried on 21 August 2008 at the burial site "Vredehof" in Tilburg. Dutch ministers Ronald Plasterk and Maxime Verhagen were present during the memorial service at the St. Lucaskerk.

Investigations
The Dutch member of parliament and Foreign Affairs spokesman Harry van Bommel said that Foreign Minister Maxime Verhagen summoned the Russian ambassador for clarification regarding reports of alleged use of cluster bombs by Russian forces in Georgia; he also urged the Dutch government to persuade the Russians to sign the Convention on Cluster Munitions. The Director-General of UNESCO, Koïchiro Matsuura, also condemned the killings and recalled the obligation under international law to respect the civilian status of reporters. He called on the authorities to investigate and take appropriate action.

On 20 October 2008 the Dutch government announced its investigation has found that Storimans was in fact killed by a Russian cluster munition after the withdrawal of the Georgian army from the city. The investigative team sent to Georgia to gather forensic evidence and eyewitness accounts concluded Storimans was killed by a munition "propelled by a type of rocket that is only found in Russia's military arsenal". Foreign Minister Maxime Verhagen called the findings "very serious" and said in a statement he had "made that clear to the Russian authorities. Cluster munitions must not be used in this way. There were no troops present in Gori and innocent civilians were killed." Verhagen said the Netherlands plans to raise the matter with the Organization for Security and Cooperation in Europe.

References

External links
 'Stan was de beste collega die ik had', RTL, 14 August 2008

Video
Journalist killed in Georgia, Sydney Morning Herald, 2008-08-13 (graphic images)

1969 births
2008 deaths
Dutch photojournalists
Journalists killed in Georgia (country)
Journalists killed while covering military conflicts
People of the Russo-Georgian War
People from Tilburg
Deaths by airstrike
Netherlands–Russia relations
21st-century Dutch photographers